Year 1021 (MXXI) was a common year starting on Sunday (link will display the full calendar) of the Julian calendar.

Events 
 By place 

 Europe 
 November – Emperor Henry II conducts his fourth Italian military campaign. He crosses the Brenner Pass with a 60,000-strong army, and reaches Verona, where he receives Lombard levies. Henry proceeds to Mantua and then into Ravenna, to spend Christmas there.
 The Taifa of Valencia, a Moorish kingdom in Al-Andalus (modern Spain), becomes independent from the Caliphate of Córdoba (approximate date).

Africa
 13 February – On one of his habitual night rides in the outskirts of Cairo, the Fatimid caliph al-Hakim bi-Amr Allah disappears, most likely assassinated by disaffected palace factions, apparently involving his sister, Sitt al-Mulk.
26 March – On the feast of Eid al-Adha, the death of al-Hakim, kept secret for six weeks, is announced, along with the succession of his son, al-Zahir li-i'zaz Din Allah. On the same day, al-Hakim's designated heir, Abd al-Rahim ibn Ilyas, is arrested in Damascus and brought to Egypt.
 The last evidence of indigenous Christian and non-Arabophone culture in Tripolitania (modern Libya) is seen.

 Asia 
 Senekerim-Hovhannes Artsruni, king of Vaspurakan (Greater Armenia), surrenders his kingdom to the Byzantine Empire. In return, he receives Sebasteia and becomes governor of Cappadocia.
Battle of Shirimni,  the Byzantine Empire under Basil II defeats  the Kingdom of Georgia under Giorgi I at Shirimni, at the Lake Palakazio, modern Lake Çıldır, Turkey
 Hovhannes-Smbat III, King of the Armenian kingdom of Ani, is attacked by his younger brother Ashot IV, and loses much power to him, becoming concurrent king of outlying territories.
 Emperor Rajendra Chola I extends his influence of the Chola Empire to the banks of the Ganges River (North India) and invades Bengal.
 Sultan Mahmud of Ghazni appoints Malik Ayaz to the throne, making Lahore (modern Pakistan) the capital of the Ghaznavid Empire.
 The Chinese capital city of Kaifeng has some half a million residents by this year. Including all those present in the nine designated suburbs, the population is over a million people.

 North America 
 Vikings known to be occupying L'Anse aux Meadows on Newfoundland (island).

Births 
 December 8 – Wang Anshi, Chinese chancellor (d. 1086)
 Eudokia Makrembolitissa, Byzantine empress (d. 1096)
 Fujiwara no Kanshi, Japanese empress consort (d. 1102)
 Wugunai, Chinese chieftain of the Wanyan tribe (d. 1074)

Deaths 
 February 13 – Al-Hakim bi-Amr Allah, Fatimid caliph (b. 985)
 March 5 – Arnulf, French archbishop and illegitimate son of Lothair III
 March 16 – Heribert, archbishop of Cologne (b. c. 970)
 July 7 – Fujiwara no Akimitsu, Japanese bureaucrat (b. 944)
 August 17 – Erkanbald, German abbot and archbishop
 August 29 – Minamoto no Yorimitsu, Japanese nobleman (b. 948)
 Fujiwara no Yoshikane, Japanese nobleman (b. 957)
 Hamid al-Din al-Kirmani, Fatimid scholar and philosopher
 Hamza ibn 'Ali ibn-Ahmad, founding leader of the Druze
 Liu Mei, Chinese official and general (approximate date)
 Mac Cú Ceanain, king of Uí Díarmata (Ireland)
 Shams al-Dawla, Buyid emir of Hamadan (Iran)
 Trilochanapala, king of the Kabul Shani dynasty

References